Many cacti are known to be psychoactive, containing phenethylamine alkaloids such as mescaline. However, the two main ritualistic (folkloric) genera are Echinopsis, of which the most psychoactive species is the  San Pedro cactus (Echinopsis pachanoi, syn. Trichocereus pachanoi), and Lophophora, with peyote (Lophophora williamsii) being the most psychoactive species. Several other species pertaining to other genera are also psychoactive, though not always used with a ritualistic intent.

Species

Globular cacti
Lophophora williamsii (peyote)

Other "peyotes"

Ariocarpus fissuratus
Coryphantha compacta (syn. C. palmeri)
Pelecyphora aselliformis
Pelecyphora strobiliformis
Lophophora diffusa
Ariocarpus retusus
Ariocarpus agavoides; kotschoubeyanus; and other species
Astrophytum asterias; capricorne; myriostigma; and other species
Aztekium ritteri; and other species
Coryphantha elephantidens; macromeris (var. runyonii); palmeri; and other species
Echinocactus grandis; grusonii; platyacanthus; visnaga; and other species
Epithelantha micromeris; and other species
Leuchtenbergia principis'''; and other speciesLophophora speciesMammillaria craigii; grahamii (var. oliviae); heyderi; (Dolichothele) longimamma; (Solisia) pectinifera; (Mamillopsis) senilis; sonorensis; and other speciesObregonia denegriiStrombocactus disciformisTurbinicarpus laui; lophophoroides; jauernigii;  (Pelecyphora) pseudopectinatus; schmiedickeanus; and other species

Other
Other North American psychoactive and/or medicinal cacti.Carnegiea giganteaEchinocereus salm-dyckianus (var. scheeri); triglochidiatus; and other speciesPachycereus pecten-aboriginum; pringleiArborescent and columnar cacti

EchinopsisEchinopsis lageniformis (syn. Trichocereus bridgesii) (Bolivian torch cactus)Echinopsis macrogona (syn. Trichocereus macrogonus), > 0.01-0.05% MescalineEchinopsis pasacana ssp. atacamensisEchinopsis pachanoi (syn. Trichocereus pachanoi) (San Pedro cactus)Echinopsis peruviana (syn. Trichocereus peruvianus) (Peruvian torch cactus)Echinopsis scopulicola (syn. Trichocereus scopulicolus), 0.82% mescaline by dry weight in the outer green layer.Echinopsis spachiana (syn. Trichocereus spachianus), Mescaline; MescalineEchinopsis tacaquirensis subsp. taquimbalensis (syn. Trichocereus taquimbalensis), > 0.005-0.025% mescalineEchinopsis terscheckii (syn. Trichocereus terscheckii, Trichocereus werdemannianus) > 0.005-0.025% Mescaline; mescaline 0.01%-2.375%
 Echinopsis valida (syn. E. validus), 0.025% mescalineEchinopsis werdermannianusOther
Other South American psychoactive and/or medicinal cacti

 Austrocylindropuntia cylindrica (syn. Opuntia cylindrica), MescalineArmatocereus laetusBrowningia spp.
 Cylindropuntia echinocarpa (syn. Opuntia echinocarpa), Mescaline 0.01%, DMPEA 0.01%, 4-hydroxy-3-5-dimethoxyphenethylamine 0.01%
 Cylindropuntia spinosior (syn. Opuntia spinosior), Mescaline 0.00004%, 3-methoxytyramine 0.001%, tyramine 0.002%, 3-4-dimethoxyphenethylamine.Epostoa lanataMatucana madisoniorumNeoraimondia macrostibasOpuntia acanthocarpa MescalineOpuntia basilaris Mescaline 0.01%, plus 4-hydroxy-3-5-dimethoxyphenethylamineSelenicereus grandiflorusStetsonia coryne''

See also 

 Entheogenic drugs and the archaeological record
 List of Acacia species known to contain psychoactive alkaloids
 List of plants used for smoking
 List of psychoactive plants
 List of psychoactive plants, fungi, and animals
 N,N-Dimethyltryptamine
 Psilocybin mushrooms

Ethnic Use
Several world regions have historically used psychoactive cacti for their properties, particularly Indigenous peoples from North America and South America, such as in Mexico and the Andes region.
For this purpose (which includes commercial harvesting) cacti plants are specifically grown in the millions. Lophophora williamsii (peyote) is used by the Native American Church (aka Peyotism).

Legality

References/Sources

External links

www.cactus-mall.com

 
Entheogens
Herbal and fungal hallucinogens
Flora of the Chihuahuan Desert
Flora of Texas
Flora of New Mexico
Flora of Northeastern Mexico
Flora of the Rio Grande valleys
Flora of Zacatecas
Native American Church
Native American religion
Huichol
Plants used in traditional Native American medicine
Psychedelic phenethylamine carriers
Cacti of the United States
Cacti of Mexico